Stollenbach may refer to:

Stollenbach (Speller Aa), a river of Lower Saxony, Germany, upper reach of the Speller Aa
Stollenbach (Black Forest), a mountain of the Black Forest, Baden-Württemberg, Germany